Howard Reid may refer to:

 Howard Reid (filmmaker), British documentary film maker and anthropologist
 Howard Reid (admiral), Royal Canadian Navy officer